Mala Punica is an early music ensemble led by Pedro Memelsdorff.

Discography 
 Ars Subtilis Ytalica, Arcana, 1994.
 D'Amor ragionando, Ballades du neo-Stilnovo en Italie, 1380-1415, Arcana, 1995.
 En attendant. L'art de la citation dans l'Italie des Visconti, 1380-1410, Arcana, 1996.
 Missa cantilena, Contrafactures liturgiques en Italie, 1380-1410, Erato, 1997
 Sidus Preclarum, The complete motets of Johannes Ciconia, 1370-1412, Erato, 1998
 Hélas Avril. Les chansons de Matteo da Perugia, Erato, 1999
 Narcisso Speculando. I madrigali di Don Paolo da Firenze, Harmonia Mundi, 2002
 Faventina. The liturgical music of Codex Faenza, Naïve, 2007

References

External links
 Official site

Early music groups